is a Japanese singer and actress. She debuted as a member of the girl group Prizmmy, where she also made television appearances in the live-action segments of the anime series Pretty Rhythm. Following the group's disbandment in 2017, she appeared in 2.5D musicals and other musical theatre productions. She has had notable roles including Sailor Saturn in Sailor Moon: Amour Eternal and Un Nouveau Voyage and Sayu Yagami in Death Note: The Musical.

Early life 
Born in Chiba Prefecture as the eldest of two children. Her little sister Mirei Takahashi was also a member of Prism Mates and their combined unit, Prism Box.

Career
In 2010, Takahashi appeared as a member of the Roni Girls—a tween dance and modeling group—as a second- and third-generation member. During her time as a member, her dance stage name was 'CaN'.

2011–2017: Pretty Rhythm series and Prizmmy 
In 2011, Takahashi was featured in Pretty Rhythm: Aurora Dream, where she, Mia Kusakabe, and Reina Kubo (and later Ayami Sema) were portrayed as trainees. She also hosted Pretty Rhythm: Dear My Future and Pretty Rhythm: Rainbow Live in Pretty Rhythm Studio along with other members of Prizmmy and Prism Mates. As a member of Prizmmy and Prism Box, she has participated in singing anime theme songs, including those of its successor PriPara.

Takahashi has released a total of three albums and 12 singles with Prizmmy and three singles with Prism Box. She also participated in their mini-album LOVE TROOPER, which was released in February 2016. In their first album, TAKE OFF!!, she was given a solo song, "Tear Smile" which was later included in THE BEST album with all Prizmmy members singing

On December 8, 2016 via showroom, Prizmmy announced their disbandment in order to focus on their solo activities. The group officially disbanded in March 2017, where Takahashi continued in the entertainment industry as a theatrical actress.

2015–2017: Sailor Moon and Death Note 
In 2015, Takahashi was chosen for the Sailor Moon musical Un Nouveau Voyage, where she played the role of Sailor Saturn. In 2016, she again played Sailor Saturn in the Sailor Moon musical, Amour Eternal.

In April 2017, she, along with the rest of the Sailor Moon musical cast (except Chibiusa) attended Anime Matsuri in Houston as guests. After six years with Prizmmy, Karin realized her love for acting during her time in Sailor Moon and decided to pursue a career in musicals.

After her role as Sailor Saturn in the Sailor Moon Musicals, Takahashi began to receive more roles in other stages. Her next biggest role was as Sayu Yagami in the Death Note Musicals. Due to COVID19, she, along with the other Death Note casts over the years, gathered together to perform "Watashi no Hero, We all Need a Hero" (Special Ver.) and it was uploaded onto YouTube.

She participated in many musicals and stages based on anime such as Sailor Moon, Death Note, Actually I am and Children of the Whales.

2018–present 
In April 2020, Takahashi made her first TV drama appearance in popular Tokusatsu "Secret × Heroine Phantomirage!" in episode 54, as a table tennis player.

Takahashi opened her own personal YouTube channel on June 27, 2020.

On October 19, 2020, it was announced she would play the role of Sakura Yanagi in the spinoff of Revue Starlight THE LIVE - 2 Transition, Revue Starlight - The LIVE Seiran - BLUE GLITTER.

On August 16, 2021, Takahashi announced that she will be voice acting for the first time with RPG Game, Ragnador as Harionna.

Personal life 
On April 1, 2019 Takahashi announced via social media that she began attending university.

Filmography

Video Games

TV Appearances

Commercials

Other

Theatre

Musicals

Stages

References

External links
 
 
 Official Ameba Blog
 Official Avex Management Profile

2000 births
Living people
21st-century Japanese actresses
21st-century Japanese singers
21st-century Japanese women singers
Actors from Chiba Prefecture
Japanese women pop singers
Japanese musical theatre actresses
Musicians from Chiba Prefecture